Bezirk Kirchdorf an der Krems is a district of the state of 
Upper Austria in Austria.

Municipalities 
Towns (Städte) are indicated in boldface; market towns (Marktgemeinden) in italics; suburbs, hamlets and other subdivisions of a municipality are indicated in small characters.
Edlbach
Grünburg
Hinterstoder
Inzersdorf im Kremstal
Kirchdorf an der Krems
Klaus an der Pyhrnbahn
Kremsmünster
Micheldorf in Oberösterreich
Molln
Nußbach
Oberschlierbach
Pettenbach
Ried im Traunkreis
Rosenau am Hengstpaß
Roßleithen
Schlierbach
Spital am Pyhrn
Sankt Pankraz
Steinbach am Ziehberg
Steinbach an der Steyr
Vorderstoder
Wartberg an der Krems
Windischgarsten

External links 
 Official site

 
Districts of Upper Austria